Sumburgh Head Lighthouse is a lighthouse on Sumburgh Head at the southern tip of the Mainland of Shetland.

History

The lighthouse was built by Robert Stevenson in 1821 and is the oldest lighthouse in Shetland. From 1906 until 1987 there was also an active foghorn, which is traversable in azimuth. The bell now hangs in the parish church at Dunrossness. The light was automated in 1991 and the keepers' houses were converted into holiday accommodation. The foghorn was restored in 2015 and sounds on special occasions. The lighthouse complex also has offices for the RSPB who look after the bird reserve which surrounds the lighthouse.

The Northern Lighthouse Board operate the light, whilst the Shetland Amenity Trust own the site and plan to restore the lighthouse facilities and build a visitor centre. The lighthouse is protected as a category A listed building.

See also

 List of lighthouses in Scotland
 List of Northern Lighthouse Board lighthouses
 List of Category A listed buildings in Shetland

References

External links

Sumburgh Head Lighthouse, Visitor Centre and Nature Reserve - official site
Sumburgh Head Lighthouse on Lighthouse Holidays page
 Northern Lighthouse Board

Lighthouses completed in 1821
Lighthouses in Shetland
Category A listed buildings in Shetland
Category A listed lighthouses
Tourist attractions in Shetland
Protected areas of Shetland
Works of Robert Stevenson (civil engineer)
Mainland, Shetland